The 1900 United States presidential election in Missouri took place on November 6, 1900. Voters chose 17 electors to represent them in the Electoral College via a popular vote pitting incumbent Republican President William McKinley against Democratic challenger William Jennings Bryan.

Missouri voted for Democrat William Jennings Bryan, giving him 51.48% of the vote versus Republican William McKinley's 45.94%, a victory margin of 5.53%. While losing Missouri, McKinley nevertheless won the national election by a 6.13% margin.

Notably, this was one of only two occasions in the twentieth century that Missouri voted for a losing presidential candidate, the state was often considered a political bellwether in that period. Between 1904 and 2004, Missouri voted for the eventual winner in every presidential election except for 1956 (coincidentally, Missouri voted for Stevenson's grandson in that election). However that reputation began to fade after voting for losing Republican candidates for two elections in a row in 2008 and 2012.  McKinley was the only president in American history to win two terms in office and lose the state twice until 2012 and is the only Republican president to ever do so.

Results

Results by county

See also
 United States presidential elections in Missouri

References

Missouri
1900
1900 Missouri elections